Events from the year 1543 in art.

Events

Works

 Benvenuto Cellini sculpts the Cellini Salt Cellar for Francis I of France

Paintings
 Hans Holbein the Younger – Portrait of John Chambers
 Lucas Horenbout – Portrait miniature of Hans Holbein the Younger
 Lorenzo Lotto – Husband and Wife
 Master IW - The murder of St. Wenceslas at St Vitus Cathedral, Prague
 Titian - Ecce Homo

Births
February 16 - Kanō Eitoku, Japanese painter of the Azuchi-Momoyama period, patriarchs of the Kanō school of Japanese painting (died 1590)
date unknown
Alessandro Fei, Italian painter who primarily worked in a Mannerist style (died 1592)
Quentin Metsys the Younger, Flemish painter at the court of Queen Elizabeth I of England (died 1589)
probable - François Quesnel, French painter of Scottish extraction (died 1619)

Deaths
October/November - Hans Holbein the Younger, German artist and printmaker who worked in a Northern Renaissance style (born 1497)
November 30 - Francesco Granacci, Italian painter (born 1469)
date unknown 
Polidoro da Caravaggio, Italian painter (born 1492/1495)
Altobello Melone, Italian painter (born 1490/1491)

References

 
Years of the 16th century in art